John Hardy Burrough (1913-1944) was a male rower who competed for England.

Rowing career
Burrough represented England and won a gold medal in the eights at the 1938 British Empire Games in Sydney, New South Wales, Australia.

Personal life
He was the son of Ernest James Burrough and Sophie Burrough, of Epsom, Surrey. He was an works control chemist (distillery and winery) by trade and lived in Downs Avenue, Epsom during 1938.

He was killed during World War II, in 1944 when serving as a flight lieutenant with the Royal Air Force Volunteer Reserve and is commemorated at the Runnymede Memorial.

References

1913 births
1944 deaths
English male rowers
Boxers at the 1938 British Empire Games
Commonwealth Games medallists in rowing
Commonwealth Games gold medallists for England
People from Epsom
Royal Air Force Volunteer Reserve personnel of World War II
Royal Air Force officers
Royal Air Force personnel killed in World War II
Military personnel from Surrey
Medallists at the 1938 British Empire Games